Aleksandr Petrovich Chernoivanov (born 13 February 1979) is a Russian handball player for Chekhovskiye Medvedi and the Russian national team.

He competed at the 2016 European Men's Handball Championship.

References

1979 births
Living people
Russian male handball players
Olympic handball players of Russia
Handball players at the 2008 Summer Olympics
Sportspeople from Krasnodar